The Connollystraße is a street in the Olympic Village and student quarter of the Olympic Park Munich.

Description 
The street was named in 1971 after James Brendan Connolly, the first Olympic champion of the modern era (1896).

It leads from the Helene-Mayer-Ring to the Kusocinskidamm to Straßbergerstraße. The road is accessible on the surface for pedestrians and cyclists, underground for motorists. Access is via the Lerchenauer Straße.

The sculpture "Olympic Rings" from 1972 by Ruth Kiener flame, with the new version from 2000 by Peter Schwenk, is found here. In Connollystraße 20, is the "Theater Unterwegs".

Connollystraße 31 was the apartment of the Israeli Olympic team who was taken hostage at the 1972 Summer Olympics. Following the Olympic Games, initial designs were in discussion to make it a "House of peace", but the building was given to the Max Planck Society, which uses it as a guest house. 200 meters south is the memorial place of the Olympia attack.

North of the Connollystraße is the Nadisee, in the west the Central University Sports Center.

Movies 
 "Architektur im Spiegel der Gesellschaft"

References 

Streets in Munich
1972 Summer Olympics
Munich massacre